Blake Allen (born 1988) is an American composer and viola player who is most known for writing the shards of an honor code junkie, music directing the 2019 revival of Over Here!, a frequent collaborator with Tina Burner, Insomnia at Carnegie Hall, writing the theme song for the talk show Doris Dear's Gurl Talk, and appearing on Shade: Queens of NYC.

Early life and education
Allen was born Blake Liahona Allen in Tucson, Arizona on July 21, 1988, the fourth of the four children of Marsha Allen (née Wilcox), a piano pedagogue, and San Allen, an engineer and Chief operating officer for Winchester Electronics. Shortly after Allen's birth, his family moved to St. Petersburg, Florida. Allen was born with spherocytosis and had his spleen removed when he was four at St. Petersburg General Hospital. Allen's family then moved to Gainesville, Florida and ultimately El Paso, Texas, where Allen spent most of his formative years. Allen grew up a member of the Church of Jesus Christ of Latter-day Saints and was in the viola sections of both the El Paso Symphony Orchestra and Las Cruces Symphony while attending Franklin High School.

Allen attended Brigham Young University where his friend Alan Taylor committed suicide, which led to the creation of his musical the shards of an honor code junkie, starring Tony Awards nominated actress Alison Fraser, Teal Wicks, Kristy Cates, Hannah Cruz, and Michael Lowney. 
 BYU is where Allen also met lifelong friend, and frequent collaborator, Christopher Koelzer (pianist), who has premiered several of Allen's works as well as being featured on Sonatas and the shards of an honor code junkie, of which Koelzer is also a character.

Allen also attended CCM in 2010–2011 and graduated with his Masters in Music from New York University where he studied viola with Stephanie Baer, composition with Joseph Church, and songwriting with Billy Seidman and Alex Forbes. Allen is currently a PhD Candidate researching fractal geometry in the music of Ligeti. Allen has been Adjunct Faculty of Violin & Viola at NYU Steinhardt since 2012.

Career
As a performer, Allen has performed with the New York Pops, Little Orchestra, on Broadway in Tootsie (musical) and Misery (play), recordings for Philip Glass, and many Off-Broadway productions including several shows and scores by Michael Friedman, Dave Malloy's Drama Desk nominated Beardo, and Marisa Michelson's Tamar of the River. Allen has also been Tony Winner, Grammy and Emmy Nominee Rob Fisher's music assistant since 2012.

Allen was one of nine composers and lyricists involved with the Off-Broadway musical Folk Wandering, which premiered in March 2018.

In 2019, Allen won the 2019 BroadwayWorld Cabaret Award for Best Recurring Series for his  "An Evening With... Series" as well as the award for Best Special Event (Solo) for Marti Gould Cummings's Marti & The Cummers while also being nominated for Best Musical Director and Best Independent Album, for his An Evening With..., Vol. 1 That same year, Allen also won the 2019 GLAM Award for Best Cabaret for Tina Burner's Witch Perfect at Alan Cumming's Club Cumming along with fellow performers Bootsie Lefaris and Tammy Spenks. In 2020, Allen won Best New Arrangement for Mack the Knife and was nominated for My Funny Valentine, Best Musical Director, and Best Recurring Series for An Evening With... Series. Allen also performed, to rave reviews, at Birdland with Lortel and Drama Desk Award winner Kuhoo Verma in early 2020.

Allen produced, music directed, and orchestrated the 2019 Off-Broadway, and first ever, revival of Over Here! at the Triad Theatre with Will Nunziata directing. Smashing box office records at the Triad Theatre, the show starred Tony Award Winner Debbie Gravitte, Jessica Hendy, Haley Swindal, and Nikka Graff Lanzarone. The revival was nominated for four BroadwayWorld Awards including Best Special Event and Best Musical Director, for Allen.

Allen also wrote a one-act play, Kelly [1955] based upon the Kelly-Hopkinsville Encounter, which premiered at the Hudson Guild Theatre in March 2019 and also starred Jessica Hendy. The score was featured on Allen's Sonatas.

In 2020, Allen released his album Sonatas featuring music which premiered at The Metropolitan Museum of Art. The album debuted at #1 on the iTunes Classical Chart, where it stayed for two weeks, and debuted at #4 on the Billboard charts Classical, where it stayed in the top 10 for two weeks. The album was recorded in one, 12-hour session, along with Allen's other album, "An Evening With...vol. 1", at Moon Recording, in Brooklyn, NYC.

At the height of the 2020 Pandemic, Allen wrote Livin' the Dreamboat with lyricist Claire Tran for the Astoria Performing Arts Center in Astoria, Queens. The show premiered on YouTube and was one of the very first theatrical shows to be written and presented virtually, in its entirety, as a result of the pandemic. Also in 2020, Allen wrote the theme song and incidental music to Doris Dear's Gurl Talk, a weekly lifestyle show on Broadway on Demand. Allen was also the music director for the Doris Dear Christmas Special, which featured Tony Nominee Karen Mason, Amra-Faye Wright, and more. For the special, Allen wrote "At Least It's Winter", a postcard song about NYC at Christmastime during the pandemic. The song was performed by Allen and Kristina Nicole Miller.

Allen is currently developing his next opera, Obsession, about the Parker-Hulme Murder, as well as a new theatrical piece, At KC's, with singer Kristina Nicole Miller and bassist Peter L. Powers. At KC's, along with Boston|Nebraska, was partially developed at the Kimmel Nelson Harding Center for the Arts in Nebraska City, Nebraska, as part of an artist residency.

the shards of an honor code junkie
After the sold-out world premiere of shards in 2017 as a benefit concert for The Trevor Project, Allen's classical-crossover score was picked up by No Reverse Records to be released in July 2021 as a storybook album. The record is being produced by Ashley Kate Adams of AKA Studio Productions and Mitchell Walker, with mixing by Grammy-nomninated sound engineer Daniel Alba, mixing by Grammy-winner Alex Venguer, and mastering by Grammy-winner Oscar Zambrano. Conducted by Allen, with Zi Alikhan as the script consultant, the album is slated to feature, in returns to their roles, Alison Fraser, Teal Wicks, Kristy Cates, Brita Filter, Hannah Cruz, Cree Carrico, Tori Scott, and Michael Lowney with Kuhoo Verma, J. Harrison Ghee, Josh Daniel, Ron Tal, and Isaac Phaman Reynolds rounding out the cast. The album was recorded in December 2020 and January 2021 at Atomic Studios in Brooklyn as well as Second Story Sound in Manhattan.

shards was also performed at 54 Below in 2016, along with Allen's other pieces Boston|Nebraska (based on Willa Cather's "A Wagner Matinee") and HOCKET, a gay-fantasia on hard drugs. shards had its Actors' Equity Association, 29-hour reading in 2015 featuring Cates, Josh Tolle, and Ephie Aardema in the lead roles. Both versions were produced by Isaac Dayley. shards was developed in part at the Banff Centre for Arts and Creativity as part of a 2014 residency.

Characters and Cast Lists

Shade: Queens of NYC
Allen joined the cast of Shade: Queens of NYC at its inception in October 2017, as Blake Allen, the then-spouse to Marti Gould Cummings. The series documents the daily reality of lives as Manhattan drag queens. In the series, Allen also music directed, arranged, and performed in several episodes culminating in the album A Very Marti Holiday, an album of Christmas music featuring Daphne Rubin-Vega, Cady Huffman, and Lesli Margherita to raise money for The Ali Forney Center.

Personal life
Allen moved to New York City in 2011 and married New York City Council candidate, and drag artist, Marti Gould Cummings in 2016. Together, they were politically active in their community of Hamilton Heights, Manhattan until their divorce in 2022.

Television

Theatre

Discography

Awards and nominations

References

External links
 
 Official Website

1988 births
Living people
American composers
American violists
Musicians from Tucson, Arizona